Bhutanthera is a genus of terrestrial orchids native to the Himalaya Mountains of Asia.

Bhutanthera albomarginata (King & Pantling) Renz - Nepal, Sikkim, Bhutan, Assam, Arunachal Pradesh
Bhutanthera albosanguinea Renz - Bhutan
Bhutanthera albovirens Renz - Bhutan 
Bhutanthera alpina (Hand.-Mazz.) Renz - Tibet, Nepal, Sikkim, Bhutan, Assam, Arunachal Pradesh
Bhutanthera fimbriata Raskoti - Nepal
Bhutanthera himalayana Renz - Bhutan

formerly included

Bhutanthera humidicola (K.Y.Lang & D.S.Deng) Ormerod, synonym of Frigidorchis humidicola (K.Y.Lang & D.S.Deng) Z.J.Liu & S.C.Chen,

References

External links
Asian Flora, Bhutanthera albomarginata (King & Pantl.) J.Renz in Sikkim, Tsomgo lake, July 2003 photos

Orchideae
Orchideae genera